Arazi Khas is a Small Town in Kallar Syedan Tehsil of  Rawalpindi District in the Punjab Province of Pakistan. Arazi Khas is famous due to Qazi family. Mughals are in majority and second cast is Choudries. Many other cast are also lived in Arazi Khas. Jamia Masjid Arazi Khas is a famous place and Baba Meran di Hatti is an oldest shop in Arazi Khas. 

Populated places in Kallar Syedan Tehsil
Towns in Kallar Syedan Tehsil